Linton railway station was a railway station in Linton, Cambridgeshire on the Stour Valley Railway. It closed in 1967. The station house is H-shaped and made of tan colour brick. It is still standing, as well as the platform and sunken trackbed space at the back of the building.

Future
The Cambridge Metro project intends to reopen Linton and Haverhill stations, for a commuter light railway to Cambridge city centre.

References

Disused railway stations in Cambridgeshire
Former Great Eastern Railway stations
Railway stations in Great Britain opened in 1865
Railway stations in Great Britain closed in 1967
Beeching closures in England
railway station